Pickering Football Club, commonly known as Pickering FC, is a Canadian semi-professional soccer club based in Pickering, Ontario that plays in League1 Ontario. The club is currently on hiatus for the 2023 season. The club was founded in 1984 as a youth soccer club and added its semi-professional club in League1 Ontario in 2014. The team plays home games at Kinsmen Park. 

The club was one of the ten original founding men's teams in League1 Ontario, which was established in 2014, as well as one of eight original founding women's teams of the League1 Ontario women's division which was established in 2015.  The semi-professional team was originally known as Durham United FC from 2014 until 2015, and then Durham United FA from 2016 until 2019, when they re-branded as Pickering FC. Also until 2019, their youth OPDL teams were known simply as United FA.

History

In 2014, the semi-professional club was established by Pickering Soccer Club to play in the newly formed League1 Ontario as one of the founding members, with a placeholder name of Durham Power FC, referencing their youth competitive teams which went by the name Pickering Power, whose nickname references the Pickering Power Plant in the city. However, in an effort to be inclusive of the larger region beyond Pickering, the club was ultimately named Durham United FC.  This inclusivity allowed the club to form working relationships with other local clubs - Oshawa Kicks SC and West Rouge SC - to participate in the club, although Oshawa Kicks later formed their own club in 2019. To recognize this partnership, in 2016, the club changed the FC to FA to be known as Durham United Football Alliance. Durham United played their first home match against Internacional de Toronto at Kinsmen Park in Pickering, Ontario on June 8, 2014, defeating the visitors 2–0.

In 2015, they added a women's club to participate in the inaugural season of the League1 Ontario women's division. The women's team won the inaugural 2015 league championship. After playing in the league's first four seasons, the men's team went on hiatus for the 2018 season (while the women's club remained active in their division), before returning to the league in 2019. In 2018, the women's team once again won the league championship, after winning the league playoffs.  

For the 2020 season, the club re-branded as Pickering Football Club, matching the name of the youth club, who changed their name from Pickering Soccer Club. After opting out of the 2021 seasons, following the COVID-19 pandemic, it was announced that the club would return to both the male and female divisions, under a new ownership group led by led by principal investors Ritchie Jeune and Chris Rivett, who co-own USL League Two side South Bend Lions FC (Jeune also owns English sixth tier side Kettering Town F.C. and Chinese club Shantou Lions).

In 2023, the club withdrew from the Premier Division in both the men's and women's divisions in League1 Ontario, after being unable to find a club partner to operate the team, although they will continue to field teams in the reserve division for each gender, with the hope of returning to the top division in 2024.

Seasons

Men

Women

Notable former players
The following players have either played at the professional or international level, either before or after playing for the League1 Ontario team:

Men

Women

References

External links
 

Soccer clubs in Ontario
League1 Ontario teams
Pickering, Ontario